The Songyuan Ring Expressway, designated as G1202 is an expressway in Northwestern Chinese province of Jilin going around the city of Songyuan.  This expressway is a branch of G12 Hunwu Expressway.

Detailed itinerary

References

Expressways in Jilin